The 1934–35 St. Louis Eagles season was the Eagles' only season in the National Hockey League (NHL). The Eagles finished last in the Canadian Division and did not qualify for the playoffs. The team made a coaching change, replacing Eddie Gerard after a 2–11 start, with Buck Boucher, who could not turn the team around.

The Ottawa Senators relocated their NHL franchise and players to St. Louis in the summer of 1934 due to financial losses in Ottawa. Despite good attendance at the St. Louis Arena, the Eagles would have financial problems, due to travel costs. The Eagles would take the Senators' spot in the Canadian Division, and would face numerous road trips to Montreal and Toronto throughout the season, despite being closer to Chicago and Detroit, who played in the American Division. The Eagles were forced to sell players, such as Syd Howe and Frank Finnigan. After the season, the NHL bought the franchise and dispersed its players.

Off-season
The St. Louis Arena had an ice surface that was  × , reputedly the "largest ice surface in the world". It was the largest ice surface in the NHL.

Regular season
The first game of NHL hockey in St. Louis was played on November 8, 1934, against the Chicago Black Hawks with a paid attendance of 12,622. The Eagles lost 1–3 and their only goal was scored by Earl Roche.

The Eagles were led offensively by Carl Voss and his team leading 31 points, team captain Syd Howe would lead the club with 14 goals, despite being traded to the Detroit Red Wings late in the season, while Glen Brydson would finish 2nd in team scoring with 29 points. Joe Jerwa, acquired by the Boston Bruins, would lead the defense with 11 points in only 16 games in St. Louis.

Bill Beveridge would be the Eagles goaltender, winning 11 games with a 2.89 GAA and 3 shutouts.

The strain of so many long train rides showed early on. Midway through the season, new head coach and former Senators player Eddie Gerard was relieved of his duties after a 2–11–0 start and was replaced by Buck Boucher, who was the head coach of the Senators the previous season. Boucher would post a 9–20–6 record in 35 games. All told, the Eagles finished 11–31–6, dead last in the league with a winning percentage of .292.

After the season, the franchise owners asked permission to suspend operations for a year. Instead, the NHL bought the players' contracts for $40,000 and dispersed the players to the other NHL teams. The NHL took back the franchise, on the condition that if it were resold, the original franchisees would share in the proceeds.

The Montreal Maroons nearly relocated to St. Louis in 1938, but the NHL nixed the move. St. Louis would be without an NHL team until 1967, when the league expanded from 6 teams to 12, and the St. Louis Blues took the ice.

Final standings

Record vs. opponents

Schedule and results

Player stats

Regular season
Scoring

Goaltending

See also
 1934–35 NHL season

References

SHRP Sports
The Internet Hockey Database
 

St. Louis Eagles
Ottawa Senators (original) seasons
St. Louis
St. Louis